William Thomas Alves (born 4 May 2005) is an English-Portuguese professional footballer who plays as a midfielder for Leicester City.

Club career
In 2018, while he was a Year nine pupil at Brookvale Groby Learning Campus, Alves won the MOTD 'Can You Kick It' competition to find the UK's best young technical freestyle footballer. On 8 January 2022, Alves made his professional club debut for Leicester as an 86th minute substitute for Ademola Lookman during a 4–1 win against Watford in the third round of the FA Cup. On 21st December 2022, Alves suffered a torn ACL in the second half of extra time in a 3-1 win over Wolves in the FA Youth Cup.

International career
Born in England, Alves is of Portuguese descent. In February 2022 he represented the England under-17 team against Scotland.

On 21 September 2022, Alves made his England U18 debut as a substitute during a 1-0 win over Netherlands at the Pinatar Arena.

Career statistics

Club

References

2005 births
Living people
English footballers
England youth international footballers
English people of Portuguese descent
Association football midfielders
Leicester City F.C. players